The City of Buffalo designates landmarks and historic districts to recognize and protect places of local, state, and national significance.

The NYS General Municipal Law § 119-AA enables local governmental programs for the preservation, restoration, and maintenance of the historical, architectural, archaeological, and cultural environment, and was adopted to promote a "spirit of stewardship and trusteeship for future generations."

The City of Buffalo has designated 148 local landmarks and 17 local historic districts, inclusive of about four percent of the parcels in the city. In addition to local designations, Buffalo possesses many properties that are either individually listed, or are contributing resources to historic districts, on the National Register of Historic Places (NRHP).

Preservation Board 
The City of Buffalo established the Preservation Board in 1976. Its powers and responsibilities are derived from Buffalo's Preservation Ordinance, which declares "as a matter of public policy that preservation, protection, conservation, enhancement, perpetuation, and utilization of sites, buildings, improvements, and districts of special character, historical or aesthetic interest, or value are necessary and required in the interest of the health, education, culture, prosperity, safety, and high quality of life of the people."

Designation Criteria 
The City of Buffalo designates landmarks and historic districts according to a process and criteria established in the Preservation Ordinance. The Preservation Board makes a recommendation, and the Common Council makes a decision, as to whether a proposed landmark, landmark site, or historic district meets one or more of the following criteria:

 It has character, interest, or value as part of the development, heritage, or cultural characteristics of the city, state, or nation.
 Its location is a site of a significant local, state, or national event.
 It exemplifies the historic, aesthetic, architectural, archaeological, educational, economic, or cultural heritage of the city, state, or nation.
 It is identified with a person or persons who significantly contributed to the development of the city, state, or nation.
 It embodies distinguishing characteristics of an architectural style valuable for the study of a period, type, method of construction, or use of indigenous materials.
 It is the work of a master builder, engineer, designer, architect, or landscape architect whose individual work has influenced the development of the city, state, or nation.
 It embodies elements of design, detailing, materials, or craftsmanship that render it architecturally significant.
 It embodies elements that make it structurally or architecturally innovative.
 It is a unique location or contains singular physical characteristics that make it an established or familiar visual feature within the city.

Any structure, property, or area that meets one or more of the above criteria must also have sufficient integrity of location, design, materials, and workmanship to make it worthy of preservation or restoration.

Project Review 
Once the City of Buffalo has designated a landmark or historic district, the designated property or properties fall under the purview of the Preservation Board. The Preservation Board reviews exterior work only, and applies the Secretary of the Interior Standards & Guidelines in making decisions on projects.

List of Local Landmarks 
A landmark is a structure, object, or site, which the City of Buffalo has designated per the criteria of the Preservation Ordinance, that has been determined to possess individual local, state, and/or national significance.

List of Local Historic Districts 
A historic district is geographically definable area, which the City of Buffalo has designated per the criteria of the Preservation Ordinance, that possesses a significant concentration, linkage, or continuity of sites, buildings, structures, or objects united historically by past events or united aesthetically by plan or development. A historic district may also comprise individual elements, separated geographically, but linked by association or history.

See also

National Register of Historic Places listings in Buffalo, New York

External links
 Buffalo Preservation Board

References 

Geography of Buffalo, New York
Buffalo, New York-related lists
Buffalo landmarks